Olgica is a feminine given name. People with the name include:

People
 Olgica Arsova (born 1995), Macedonian football player
 Olgica Bakajin, American scientist 
 Olgica Batić (born 1981), Serbian lawyer and politician
 Olgica Milenkovic, Serbian engineer

Fictional characters
 Olgica, one of the main characters in the 2012 Croatian movie Night Boats

Macedonian feminine given names
Serbian feminine given names